Burnsville, also known as Byrnville, is an unincorporated community in Dallas County, Alabama.

History
Burnsville was named for James H. Burns, who settled in the area in 1838. A post office operated under the name Burnsville from 1841 to 1956.

The Everdale Baptist Church in Burnsville is listed on the Alabama Register of Landmarks and Heritage.

Notable person
 Leon Berry (1914-1996), American organist

References

Unincorporated communities in Alabama
Unincorporated communities in Dallas County, Alabama